Aircraft Museum Dhangadhi is an aviation museum located in Dhangadhi, Nepal some 500 km west from Kathmandu. It was established by former Nepalese pilot Bed Upreti and his trust on 17 September 2014 as the first aircraft museum of Nepal. The museum is inside a defunct Fokker-100 plane, which is 35.53 meters long and was operated by Cosmic Air until its shut down in 2008. There are around 200 miniature commercial planes and fighter jets on display. Along with the miniature planes, there are aerial photo gallery and cockpit cafe. The revenue from the museum is used to assist cancer patients. A second museum, the Aviation Museum Kathmandu, has been established in the capital of Nepal, Kathmandu by Bed Upreti Trust in 2017 following the success of the Aircraft Museum Dhangadhi.

References 

Museums in Nepal
Aerospace museums
2014 establishments in Nepal